Statistics of Japan Football League in the 1992 season.

First Division

Second Division
Seino Unyu and Osaka Gas had been promoted automatically after winning the Regional Playoffs.

References

1996
2
Japan
Japan